Lotsawa is a Tibetan word used as a title to refer to the native Tibetan translators, such as Vairotsana, Rinchen Zangpo, Marpa Lotsawa, Tropu Lotsawa Jampa Pel and others, who worked alongside Indian scholars or panditas to translate Buddhist texts into Tibetan from Sanskrit, Classical Chinese and other Asian languages. It is thought to derive from Sanskrit locchāva, which is said to mean "bilingual" or "eyes of the world." The term is also used to refer to modern-day translators of Tibetan buddhist texts.

Jnanasutra, a Nyingmapa, was the principal lotsawa of the first wave of translations from Sanskrit to Tibetan.

Yudra Nyingpo, one of the chief disciples of Vairotsana, was also a principal lotsawa of the first translation stage of texts into Tibetan.

See also 
Rinchen Zangpo
Marpa Lotsawa

References

Tibetan Buddhist titles
Translators to Tibetan
Translators from Sanskrit
Languages of Tibet